Taman is a seaport on the Taman Peninsula in area of Cape Zhelezniy Rog, in the village of Volna, near the village of Taman in Temryuksky District of Krasnodar Krai, Russia.

Overview
Business specialization - transshipment of goods for export. The port has terminals built and under construction for transshipment of the following cargoes: oil and oil products, liquefied petroleum gases, ammonia, grain, coal, fertilizers, iron ore, sulfur, steel products, and containerized cargo. In 2015, the port's cargo turnover amounted to 12.3 million tons (an increase of 20.8%), which raised it to 15th place among the ports of the Russian Federation. After the construction of the port terminals is completed, cargo turnover should reach 70 million tons, which will make the port the second or third in Russia.

The port uses transport approaches common with the Crimean bridge, which allows transshipment of cargo both through the Taman Peninsula and through the Crimea.

Depths on the approaches to the port are 20–25 meters. Vessels with a deadweight of up to 220,000 tons, length up to 300 m, width up to 50 m with a draft at berths up to 14 m and at a runway - up to 21 meters can enter the port.

History and activities 
The seaport is still under construction, but is already open for international traffic. It was officially opened for the services provision by the Ministry of Transport of the Russian Federation order of September 23, 2009 No.169.

[
{
  "type": "ExternalData",
  "service": "geoline",
  "ids": "Q4450802",
  "properties": {
    "stroke-width": 4
  }},
{
  "type": "ExternalData",
  "service": "geoshape",
  "ids": "Q4450802",
  "properties": {
    "stroke-width": 4
  }
}
]

Grain terminal 
The first part of the grain terminal with a capacity of 5 million tons in the port of Taman was opened in September 2011.
The owner of the grain terminal was ZAO Taman-invest. Grain terminal management company is Taman Grain Terminal Complex LLC. 2600 m long berth is carried out for reception of vessels for loading grain crops. The maximum draft at berths was 12.1 m, allowing vessels with a carrying capacity of up to 60,000 tons to be received.

Terminals and port facilities

Road and rail transport approaches

Port handling

References

Ports and harbours of the Black Sea
Ports and harbours of Russia
Taman Peninsula
2009 establishments in Russia